Current Atherosclerosis Reports is a bimonthly peer-reviewed medical journal publishing review articles pertaining to atherosclerosis. It was established in 1999 and is published by Springer Science+Business Media. The editor-in-chief is Antonio Gotto (Weill Cornell Medical College). According to the Journal Citation Reports, the journal has a 2014 impact factor of 3.417.

References

External links

Cardiology journals
Springer Science+Business Media academic journals
Publications established in 1999
Bimonthly journals
Review journals
English-language journals